Mohammed Trik (died 1682) was an Ottoman official. He was the Dey of Algiers from 1671 to 1682. He was the first dey of Algiers. 

He reduced Ottoman authority to a ceremonial role, and ousted the Janissary aghas with the help of the Raises.

In a report from 1676, he is noted to have been married to a former slave concubine, described as a "cunning covetous English woman, who would sell her soule for a Bribe", with whom the English viewed it as "chargeable to bee kept in her favour… for Countrysake".

References

Sources
 

Deys of Algiers
Slave owners
Year of birth missing
1682 deaths